Ekkehard Gries (September 16, 1936 – July 30, 2001) was a German politician of the Free Democratic Party (FDP) and former member of the German Bundestag.

Life 
From 1987 to 1994, Gries was a member of the German Bundestag and transport policy spokesman for the FDP parliamentary group. He had entered parliament in both legislative periods via the state list of the FDP Hessen.

Literature

References

1936 births
2001 deaths
Members of the Bundestag for Hesse
Members of the Bundestag 1990–1994
Members of the Bundestag 1987–1990
Members of the Bundestag for the Free Democratic Party (Germany)
Members of the Landtag of Hesse